Jim Higgins (2 December 1930 – 13 October 2002) was a British revolutionary socialist and leading member of the International Socialists.

Biography
Born into a working-class family in Harrow, London, Higgins joined the Young Communist League at 14.  Age eighteen, he was apprenticed to the Post Office as a telecommunications engineer.

After National Service in the early 1950s, he became active in both the Communist Party of Great Britain and the Post Office Engineering Union. He left the Communist Party after Nikita Khrushchev's 1956 secret speech and the Soviet invasion of Hungary. Higgins instead joined the Trotskyist Socialist Labour League, soon leaving to join the Socialist Review Group which became the International Socialists (IS), and becoming the group's Secretary.

By the 1960s, Higgins was a POEU branch secretary and was elected to the union's national executive, but he gave up his union work to become IS's full-time national secretary in the early 1970s.  In a burst of internal quarrels in the period 1973-76 he left the organisation. He was a founder member of the Workers League, but this organisation soon broke apart.  Instead, he built a new life as a journalist, later moving into magazine design. He remained active as a writer and speaker at left wing meetings up until his death and in 1997 published a memoir, More Years for the Locust.

Papers left by Higgins and Al Richardson have been deposited with Senate House Library, University of London.

Selected publications
Lenin (Socialist Worker pamphlet) April 1970
More Years for the Locust, IS Group, London, 1997

References

External links
Marxists' Internet Archive, articles by Jim Higgins

1930 births
2002 deaths
British male journalists
British trade unionists
British Trotskyists
People from Harrow, London
Communist Party of Great Britain members
Socialist Workers Party (UK) members
Workers Revolutionary Party (UK) members
British political party founders